The Frank W. Crane House is a historic house at 11 Avon Way in Quincy, Massachusetts, United States.  The -story wood-frame house was built c. 1902, on President's Hill, an affluent residential development made on land formerly part of the Adams family estate.  It is a graceful Colonial Revival house, with a symmetrical three-bay facade.  The front entry is sheltered by a portico, supported by doubled Doric columns, projects, and is topped by a low balcony with urn-shaped balusters.

The house was listed on the National Register of Historic Places in 1989.

See also
National Register of Historic Places listings in Quincy, Massachusetts

References

Colonial Revival architecture in Massachusetts
Houses completed in 1902
Houses in Quincy, Massachusetts
National Register of Historic Places in Quincy, Massachusetts
Houses on the National Register of Historic Places in Norfolk County, Massachusetts